The Oregon Air and Space Museum, located on the grounds of the Eugene Airport in Eugene, Oregon, holds a collection of historic aircraft and spacecraft.

History
The museum opened in 1991. The museum expanded its facilities in 1999 with a 6300 square foot (585 m2) addition.

Exhibits

The museum features aircraft with an emphasis on Oregon's aerospace history.

Displays include
Globe Swift
Nieuport 17
Rutan Quickie
Grumman A-6E Intruder
McDonnell Douglas A-4 Skyhawk
Mitchell Wing B-10
MiG-17
Smith Termite
Pratt & Whitney R-4360 Wasp Major dynamic functioning display
1000+ 1:72 model aircraft display

See also
List of aerospace museums

References

External links

 

Aerospace museums in Oregon
Museums in Eugene, Oregon
Museums established in 1991
1991 establishments in Oregon